Emily Tarver is an actress, comedian and musician from Houston, Texas.

Tarver has performed as a cast member of VH1's series "Best Week Ever" and performs stand-up and improvisational comedy in a variety of venues, including the Upright Citizens Brigade Theatre, and is a singer in the band Summer and Eve. 
She has starred as "Emily" in a series of American television commercials for the furniture company Havertys, and has appeared in national commercials for Lowe's, Comcast, Publix, AT&T, and Yoplait, among others. One Yoplait commercial starring Tarver was pulled from broadcast following complaints by the National Eating Disorders Association. Tarver responded  "So they pulled my yogurt ad because it 'promotes eating disorders'. Ironically, now I will not be able to afford to eat."

Personal life

In July 2018, it was confirmed that Tarver is in a relationship with her Orange Is the New Black co-star Vicci Martinez.

Filmography

References

External links
 Emily Tarver

American women singers
LGBT actresses
American LGBT singers
Living people
Place of birth missing (living people)
Year of birth missing (living people)
American television actresses
American film actresses
American stand-up comedians
American women comedians
Actresses from Houston
Singers from Texas
21st-century American women
American LGBT comedians